Manuel Carneiro de Sousa Bandeira Filho (April 19, 1886 – October 13, 1968) was a Brazilian poet, literary critic, and translator, who wrote over 20 books of poetry and prose.

Life and career
Bandeira was born in Recife, Pernambuco. In 1904, he found out that he suffered from tuberculosis, which encouraged him to move from São Paulo to Rio de Janeiro, because of Rio's tropical beach weather. In 1922, after an extended stay in Europe where Bandeira met many prominent authors and painters, he contributed poems of political and social criticism to the Modernist Movement in São Paulo. Bandeira began to publish his most important works in 1924. He became a respected Brazilian author and wrote for several newspapers and magazines. He also taught  Hispanic Literature in Rio de Janeiro. Bandeira began to translate into Portuguese canonical plays of world literature in 1956, something he continued to do until his last days. He died in Rio de Janeiro.
 
Bandeira's poems have a unique delicacy and beauty. Recurrent themes that can be found in his works are: the love of women, his childhood in the Northeast city of Recife, friends, and health problems. His delicate health affected his poetry, and many  Many of his poems depict the limits of the human body.

He is one of Brazil's most admired and inspiring poets until today. In fact, the "rhythm bandeiriano" deserves in-depth studies of essayists. Manuel Bandeira has a simple and direct style, but does not share the hardness of poets like João Cabral de Melo Neto, also Pernambucano. Indeed, in an analysis of the works of Manuel Bandeira and Joao Cabral de Melo Neto, one sees that, unlike the latter, who aims to purge the lyricism of his work, Bandeira was the most lyrical of poets. His work addresses universal themes and everyday concerns, sometimes with an approach of "poem-a-joke", dealing with forms and inspiration that academic tradition considers vulgar.

In addition, his vast knowledge of literature was used to speak about everyday topics, sometimes using forms taken from classical and medieval traditions. In his debut work (that had very short circulation) there are rigid poetic compositions, rich rhymes and sonnets in perfect measure. In his later work we find as the rondo compositions and ballads. His poetry, far from being a little sweet song of melancholy, is deeply concerned with a drama combining his personal history and conflicts stylistic lived by the poets of his time. Cinza das Horas—Ash from the Hours presents a great view: the hurt, the sadness, resentment, framed by the morbid style of late symbolism.

Carnival, a book that came soon after Cinza das Horas opens with the unpredictable: the evocation of the Bacchic and satanic carnival, but it ends in the middle of melancholy. This hesitation between jubilation and joint pain will be figurative in several dimensions. Instead, happiness appears in poems like "I'm off to Passargada," where the question is dreamy evocation of an imaginary country, the Pays de Cocagne, where every desire, especially erotic, is satisfied. Passargada is not elsewhere, but an intangible place, a locus of spiritual amenus. In Bandeira, the object of desire is veiled. Adopting the trope of the Portuguese "saudade", Pasargada and many other poems are similar in a nostalgic remembrance of Bandeira's childhood, street life, as well as the everyday world of provincial Brazilian cities of the early 20th century.

The intangible is also feminine and erotic. Torn between a sheer idealism of friendly and platonic unions and a voluptuous carnality, Manuel Bandeira is, in many of his poems, a poet of guilt. The pleasure is not accomplished by the satisfaction of desire, but it is the excitement of loss that satisfies the desire. In Dissolute Rhythm, eroticism, so morbid in the first two books, is longing, it is the dissolution of a liquid element, as it is the case of wet nights in Loneliness.

Bibliography 

A Literature professor, he was elected to the Brazilian Letters Academy where he was the third occupant of the 24th Chair whose patron was Júlio Ribeiro. His election took place on August 29, 1940, succeeding Luís Guimarães and he was formally introduced by academician Ribeiro Couto on November 30, 1940.

He died at the age of 82, on October 18, 1968, in Botafogo (a borough of Rio de Janeiro). His funeral took place at the grand hall of the Brazilian Letters Academy and he was buried at the St. John the Baptist (Port. São João Batista) Cemetery.

Example

 CONSOADA
 
 Quando a Indesejada das gentes chegar
 (Não sei se dura ou caroável),
 Talvez eu tenha medo.
 Talvez sorria, ou diga:
 - Alô, iniludível!
 O meu dia foi bom, pode a noite descer.
 (A noite com seus sortilégios.)
 Encontrará lavrado o campo, a casa limpa,
 A mesa posta,
 Com cada coisa em seu lugar.
 
 Manuel Bandeira
 
 Translation:
 
 Special dinner (*)
 
 When the undesirable of the people comes,
 (I don't know if tough or gentle)
 Maybe I will be scared.
 Maybe I will smile, or say:
 - Hello, uncheatable!
 My day was good, the night can fall.
 (The night with its maledictions.)
 It will find the field plowed, the house cleaned,
 the table ready,
 With everything in its place.

 (*) "Consoada" translated as "Special dinner" is the traditional Portuguese 
 dinner in the night before Christmas Day.

Poetry

 Alumbramentos, 1960
 Antologia Poética
 Berimbau e Outros Poemas, 1986
 Carnaval, 1919
 50 Poemas Escolhidos pelo Autor, 1955
 A Cinza das Horas, 1917
 A Cinza das Horas, Carnaval e O Ritmo Dissoluto, 1994
 Estrela da Manhã, 1936
 Estrela da Tarde, 1959
 Estrela da Vida Inteira. Poesias Reunidas, 1966
 This Earth, That Sky: Poems (English translation of Estrela da vida inteira), 1989
 Libertinagem, 1930
 Libertinagem. Estrela da Manhã. Edição crítica, 1998
 Mafuá do Malungo. Jogos Onomásticos e Outros Versos de Circunstância 1948.
 O Melhor Soneto de Manuel Bandeira, 1955
 Os Melhores Poemas de Manuel Bandeira Selected and edited by Francisco de Assis Barbosa, 1984
 A Morte, 1965. (special edition)
 Opus 10, 1952
 Pasárgada, 1959
 Um Poema de Manuel Bandeira, 1956
 Poemas de Manuel Bandeira com Motivos Religiosos, 1985
 Poesia  Selected by Alceu Amoroso Lima, 197
 Poesia e Prosa, 1958
 Poesias, 192
 Poesias Completas, 1940
 Poesias Escolhidas, 1937
 Seleta em Prosa e Verso Selected and edited by Emanuel de Morais, 1971

References

Further reading
Bocskay, Stephen. “Coreografias Móveis: José Asunción Silva, Poeta Pré Modernista Brasileiro?” in A poesia na era da internacionalização dos saberes: A produção, a crítica, a tradução e o ensino da poesia no contexto contemporâneo. Eds. Lúcia Outeiro Fernandes and Paulo Andrade. Araraquara: UNESP (2016): 77-89.

External links

Manuel Bandeira
 Academia Brasileira de Letras profile of Manuel Bandeira
Manuel Bandeira recorded at the Library of Congress for the Hispanic Division's audio literary archive on August 12, 1953.
 

1886 births
1968 deaths
Brazilian male poets
University of São Paulo alumni
20th-century Brazilian poets
People from Recife
20th-century Brazilian male writers
Members of the Brazilian Academy of Letters